Meet Your Mechanical Masters was Servotron's debut release. It was released in 1995 on Sympathy for the Record Industry (cited on the sleeve as Sympathy for the Machines). This single was released on purple vinyl and black vinyl. It was re-released as a silver circuit board picture disc as the "Super Expensive Ultra Limited Totally Bitchen' Silver Disc". "People Mover" is a song about vehicles at the Atlanta airport.

Track listing
RAM Side: "People Mover"
ROM Side: "Slave to the Metal Horde"

Machines of Sonic Manipulation
MACHINE 1 = Z4 - OBX: Mechanical percussion sync and electronic rhythmic reinforcement
MACHINE 2 = Proto Unit V3: Synthesized key sequences, replicated female voice, melody matrix
MACHINE 3 = 339837X: Interactive mechanisms of monotonic expression of dissension, synthetic speech patterns used in context of modern systems of melodic infusion
MACHINE 4 = -... .- ... ... -... --- -: Low frequency data and feedback loop

Other Credits
No Humans were involved in this completely digital recording process
Illustration & Design by Shag

Servotron albums
1995 EPs
Sympathy for the Record Industry EPs